Deivid (born 1979), born Deivid de Souza, is a Brazilian football manager and former footballer

Deivid may also refer to:
Deivid (born 1988), born Deivid Rodrigo Soares De Macedo, Brazilian football forward 
Deivid (born 1989), born David Omar Rodríguez Barrera, Spanish football defender 
Deivid Willian da Silva (born 1989), born Deivid Willian da Silva, Brazilian football defensive midfielder

See also
David (name)